The Parliament of the Balearic Islands (Catalan: Parlament de les Illes Balears) is the unicameral autonomous parliament of the Balearic Islands, one of the autonomous communities of Spain. The Parliament, composed of 59 elected seats, is located in the city of Palma, on the island of Majorca.

Precedents

Parliamentary Assembly of the Balearic Islands (1977–1978)
The Parliamentary Assembly of the Balearic Islands was an unofficial provisional body serving as pre-autonomic representation from 30 July 1977. It was composed by the eleven elected deputies and senators in the 1977 general election. Additionally, on 13 June 1978, the pre-autonomic regime decree installed the new Inter-island General Council, and two more representatives from Menorca and two more from the Pityusic Islands were elected. The President was Jeroni Albertí, member of the Union of the Democratic Centre (UCD). When the Inter-island General Council was constituted on 24 July 1978, the Parliamentary Assembly of the Balearic Islands was dissolved.

The composition of the Assembly was defined by the 1977 general election results in the Balearic Islands, which were the following:

Inter-island General Council (1978–1983)

The 1978 Spanish Constitution anticipated the organisation of the State in Autonomous Communities. The different historic regions and nationalities could access to the autonomy through two ways; the so-called fast way (article 151) and the so-called slow or common way (article 143). During the process of achievement, the province or provinces could request to the Congress of Deputies the regime of preautonomy, as a transition period from the centralism to the self-government. On 13 June 1978 the Inter-island General Council, preautonomous body for the Balearic Islands, was constituted by royal decree. It substituted the Provincial Council of the Balearics and possessed some of the basic competences in health and culture, although its main function was drafting a Statue of Autonomy for the archipelago. On a 17 July 1978 decree, the election of its members was defined. On 1 March 1983 the Statue of Autonomy of the Balearic Islands came into effect, and the Inter-island General Council disappeared, being replaced by the Government of the Balearic Islands.

During the five years of its existence, the institution had two presidents. Jeroni Albertí (UCD) resigned in 1982 before participating in the foundation of Majorcan Union (UM). The Menorcan Francesc Tutzó (UCD), who had been the vice-president, replaced Albertí, and governed the body until the 1983 regional election.

Presidents of the Parliament of the Balearic Islands

See also 
President of the Balearic Islands

References 

 
Balearic Islands
Balearic Islands